The Complete Recordings can refer to several albums:

The Complete Recordings (Oh-OK album)
The Complete Recordings (Robert Johnson album)
Complete Recordings (Black Tambourine album)

As well as:
The Classic Quartet: The Complete Impulse! Recordings
The Columbia Years 1943–1952: The Complete Recordings
The Complete 1957 Riverside Recordings
The Complete Blue Note and Roost Recordings
The Complete Columbia Recordings of Miles Davis with John Coltrane
Complete First National Band Recordings
The Complete Library of Congress Recordings
The Complete MCA Studio Recordings
The Complete Prestige Recordings (John Coltrane album)
The Complete Reprise Studio Recordings
The Complete Solid State Recordings of the Thad Jones / Mel Lewis Orchestra
The Complete Studio Recordings (ABBA album)
The Complete Village Vanguard Recordings, 1961
The Complete Wooden Nickel Recordings
Fillmore West 1969: The Complete Recordings
The Heavyweight Champion: The Complete Atlantic Recordings
Message in a Box: The Complete Recordings
Naked City: The Complete Studio Recordings
New York Journeyman - Complete Recordings
Their Complete General Recordings
Winterland 1973: The Complete Recordings

See also
The Complete Studio Recordings (disambiguation)